DZU or Dzu may refer to

Dziennik Ustaw
Dzo
Ngo Dzu
Shen Dzu
Trương Đình Dzu